Donald Ray Hansen, (born August 20, 1944) is a former professional American football linebacker in the National Football League (NFL) from 1966 to 1977. He was known as an extremely hard hitter and an underrated as well as overachieving linebacker.

Hansen was a member of FJ Reitz High School's mythical 1961 State Champion football team; he was also a member of the 1964 Rose Bowl Champion Fighting Illini. Hansen was drafted into the NFL in 1966 by the Minnesota Vikings. He was also drafted by the Miami Dolphins in the 7th round of the 1966 AFL draft.

References

1944 births
Living people
People from Warrick County, Indiana
American football linebackers
Illinois Fighting Illini football players
Minnesota Vikings players
Atlanta Falcons players
Seattle Seahawks players
Green Bay Packers players
Players of American football from Indiana